Dialectica scalariella (echium leaf miner) is a moth of the family Gracillariidae. It is found from France to the Iberian Peninsula, Italy and the Balkan Peninsula. Recently an imago was found in Great Britain. It was introduced in Australia for the biological control of the weed Echium plantagineum and has since spread to New Zealand.

The larvae feed on Anchusa strigosa, Borago, Cynoglossum creticum, Echium aculeatum, Echium giganteum, Echium plantagineum, Echium vulgare, Myosotis latifolia and Symphytum officinale. They mine the leaves of their host plant. The mine is lower-surface and starts at a flat, iridescent egg shell, then an undulating epidermal corridor that abruptly widens into an elliptic blotch. The blotch almost fills all space between the midrib and the leaf margin. The blotch has two levels and a silken cocoon is attached to the roof of the upper floor. The frass is concentrated in a very thin, continuous pale brown line and is coiled in the corridor part.

The pupa lies naked in the mine.

External links
 
 Australian Insects 
 Plant Parasites of Europe

Dialectica (moth)
Lepidoptera used as pest control agents
Moths described in 1850
Moths of Australia
Moths of Europe
Moths of New Zealand
Moths of Asia
Taxa named by Philipp Christoph Zeller